Series 6 of Top Gear, a British motoring magazine and factual television programme, was broadcast in the United Kingdom on BBC Two during 2005, consisting of eleven episodes between 22 May and 7 August. This series saw the presenters (mainly Jeremy Clarkson) introducing the "Stig" with comedic lines regarding nonsensical facts about the character, an element that would be used until the end of the twenty-third series, and featured a survey regarding the "Greatest Driving Song of All Time" from the top five songs that were revealed during the latter half of the series. This series' highlight included recreating the programme's theme tune with different car engines, and the presenters having their mothers evaluate three different cars.

Episodes

References

External links
Top Gear (series 6) at Official Top Gear Site

2005 British television seasons
Top Gear seasons